Albertson(s) may refer to:

Albertson (name), a given name or surname (including a list of people with the name)
Albertsons, an American grocery company based in Boise, Idaho
Albertson, New York, a hamlet and census-designated place in Nassau County, New York, US
Albertson Brook, a waterway in New Jersey, US
Albertson College of Idaho, former name of the College of Idaho in Caldwell, Idaho, US

See also
Albertson v. Subversive Activities Control Board, a 1965 US Supreme Court decision
Albertsen, a surname (including a list of people with the name)